= Rebel Army =

Rebel Army may refer to:

- Confederate States Army
- Cork City F.C., an Irish association football team
- Supporters of the Melbourne Rebels, an Australian rugby union team
